Ellery Queen Mystery Magazine (EQMM) honors authors each year as voted upon by readers, hence the name, Readers Choice Award. Recipients include many of the most popular authors of thrillers and mysteries.

Presentation

Awards are bestowed in April of the following year, coinciding with the annual Mystery Writers of America conference, at an informal ceremony sponsored by Dell Publishing.

Recipients

2020

1st : Barb Goffman, "Dear Emily Etiquette," Sept-Oct 2020
 2nd : John M. Floyd, "Crow's Nest," Jan-Feb 2020
 3rd : Gregory Fallis, "Terrible Ideas," Sept-Oct 2020

2019

 1st : David Dean, "The Duelist," May-June 2010
 2nd : Paul D. Marks, "Fade-out on Bunker Hill," Mar-Apr 2019
 3rd : Doug Allyn (tied), "The Dutchy," Nov-Dec 2019
3rd: G.M. Malliet, "Whiteout," Jan-Feb 2019

2018
 1st : Stacy Woodson, "Duty, Honor, Hammett", Nov-Dec 2018
 2nd : Josh Pachter, "50", Nov-Dec 2018
 3rd : David Dean, "Sofee", Mar-Apr 2018

2017
 1st : Brendan Dubois, "Flowing Waters", Jan 2017
 2nd : Doug Allyn, "Tombstone", Nov-Dec 2017
 3rd : Dave Zeltserman, "Cramer in Trouble", Mar-Apr 2017

2016
 1st : Paul D. Marks, "Ghosts of Bunker Hill", Dec 2016
 2nd : Doug Allyn, "Puncher's Chance", Jun 2016
 3rd : Doug Allyn, "The Dropout", Mar-Apr 2016

2014
 1st : Doug Allyn, "The Snow Angel", Jan 2014
 2nd : Marilyn Todd, "Blood Red Roses", Sep-Oct 2014
 3rd : Miriam Grace Monfredo, "The Tavern Keeper's Daughter", Dec 2014

2013
 1st : Dave Zeltserman, "Archie Solves the Case", May 2013
 2nd : Doug Allyn, "Borrowed Time", Mar-Apr 2013
 3rd : Marilyn Todd, "The Wickedest Town in the West", Jun 2013

2012
 1st : Doug Allyn, "Wood-Smoke Boys", Mar-Apr 2012
 2nd : David Dean, "Mariel", Dec 2012
 3rd : Lia Matera, "Champawat", Sep-Oct 2012

2011
 1st : P. N. Elrod, "Beach Girl", Nov 2011
 2nd : Doug Allyn, "A Penny for the Boatman", Mar-Apr 2011
 3rd : Clark Howard, "Hangman's Rhapsody", Sep-Oct 2011

2010
 1st : Dave Zeltserman, "Archie’s Been Framed", Sep-Oct 2010
 2nd : Doug Allyn, "The Scent of Lilacs", Sep-Oct 2010
 3rd : Doug Allyn, "Days of Rage", Mar-Apr 2010

2009
 1st : Doug Allyn, (tied) "An Early Christmas", Jan 2009
 1st : Mick Herron, "Dolphin Junction", Dec 2009
 2nd : Clark Howard, "White Wolves", Nov 2009
 3rd : Dave Zeltserman, "Julius Katz", Sep-Oct 2009

2008
 1st : Kristine Kathryn Rusch, "The Secret Lives of Cats", Jul 2008
 2nd : Doug Allyn, "The Sonnets of September", Jul 2008
 3rd : Brendan DuBois, "The Blue Plate Special", Mar-Apr 2008

2007
 1st : David Dean, (tied) "Ibrahim's Eyes", Jun 2007
 1st : Edward D. Hoch, "The Theft of the Ostracized Ostrich", Sep-Oct 2007
 2nd : Dale C. Andrews and Kurt Sercu, "The Book Case", May 2007
 3rd : Doug Allyn, "Stone-Cold Christmas", Jan 2007

2006
 1st : Leigh Lundin (writing under L. Leigh), "Swamped", Aug 2006
 2nd : Doug Allyn, "The Black Chapel", Sep-Oct 2006
 3rd : Edward D. Hoch, "A Convergence of Clerics", Dec 2006

2005
 1st : Doug Allyn, "Wolf Woman Bay", Jun 2005
 2nd : J.A. Konrath, "With a Twist", Dec 2005
 3rd : Robert S. Levinson, "Death Conquers All", Sep-Oct 2005

2004
 1st : Doug Allyn, "The Gin Mill", Sep-Oct 2004
 2nd : Clark Howard, "Deep Lock", Dec 2004
 3rd : Clark Howard, "Tequila Memories", Jun 2004

2003
 1st : Doug Allyn, "Palace in the Pines", Jul 2003
 2nd : Clark Howard, "The Mask of Peter", Apr 2003
 3rd : Clark Howard, "The Leper Colony", Aug 2003

2002
 1st : Jeffery Deaver, "Without Jonathan", Nov 2002
 2nd : Edward D. Hoch, "The Problem of Bailey's Buzzard", Dec 2002
 3rd : Doug Allyn, "Telephone to Forever", Jul 2002

2001
 1st : Peter Sellers, "Avenging Miriam", Dec 2001
 2nd : David Handler, "The Mondo Whammy", Sep-Oct 2001
 3rd : Neil Schofield, "Groundwork", Nov 2001

2000
 1st : Doug Allyn, "The Death Row Pet Show", Apr 2000
 2nd : Doug Allyn, "The Christmas Mitzvah", Dec 2000
 3rd : Donald Olson, "Don't Go Upstairs", Aug 2000

1999
 1st : Clark Howard, "The Global Man", Dec 1999
 2nd : Michael A. Kahn, "The Bread of Affliction", Sep-Oct 1999
 3rd : Minette Walters, "The Tinder Box", Dec 1999

1998
 1st : Kristine Kathryn Rusch, "Details", Dec 1998
 2nd : Barbara D'Amato, "Of Course You Know That Chocolate Is a Vegetable", Nov 1998
 3rd : Joan Richter, "Recipe Secrets", Sep-Oct 1998

1997
 1st : Jeffery Deaver, "Double Jeopardy", Sep-Oct 1997
 2nd : Doug Allyn, "Copperhead Run", Jun 1997
 3rd : George C. Chesbro, "The Problem with the Pigs", Jun 1997

1996
 1st : Doug Allyn, "Roadkill", May 1996
 2nd : Doug Allyn, "Puppyland", Sep-Oct 1996
 3rd : Steven Saylor, "The White Fawn", Dec 1996

1995
 1st : Doug Allyn, (tied) "Franken Kat", mid-Dec 1995
 1st : Jeffery Deaver, "Gone Fishing", Oct 1995
 2nd : Brendan DuBois, "Heirlooms", Jul 1995
 3rd : Edward D. Hoch, "The Killdeer Chronicles", Mid-Dec 1995

1994
 1st : Jan Burke, "Unharmed", mid-Dec 1994
 2nd : Doug Allyn, "Black Water", Oct 1994
 3rd : Doug Allyn, "The Cross-Wolf", Mid-Dec 1994

1993
 1st : Doug Allyn, "The Ghost Show", Dec 1993
 2nd : Steven Saylor, "The House of the Vestals", Apr 1993
 3rd : Peter Lovesey, "You May See a Strangler", Mid-Dec 1993

1992
 1st : Doug Allyn, "Candles in the Rain", Nov 1992
 2nd : Jo Bannister, "Howler", Oct 1992
 3rd : Doug Allyn, "Icewater Mansions", Jan 1992

1991
 1st : Peter Lovesey, "The Crime of Miss Oyster Brown", May 1991
 2nd : Clark Howard, "Dark Conception", Oct 1991
 3rd : Peter Lovesey, "Supper with Miss Shivers", Mid-Dec 1991

1990
 1st : Clark Howard, "Deeds of Valor", Nov 1990
 2nd : Clark Howard, "Challenge the Widow-Maker", Aug 1990
 3rd : Peter Massarelli, "Once Upon a Time", Dec 1990

1989
 1st : James Powell, "A Dirge for Clowntown", Nov 1989
 2nd : Doug Allyn, "Star Pupil", Oct 1989
 3rd : Patricia Moyes, "The Faithful Cat", Dec 1989

1988
 1st : Clark Howard, "The Dakar Run", Aug 1988
 2nd : Peter Lovesey, "The Wasp", Nov 1988
 3rd : Clark Howard, "The Color of Death", Jun 1988

1987
 1st : Robert Barnard, "The Woman in the Wardrobe", Dec 1987
 2nd : Ann Bayer, "A Pleasure to Deal With", Nov 1987
 3rd : John F. Suter, "That Man's Moccasins Have Holes", Jul 1987

1986
 1st : Clark Howard, "Scalplock", Jul 1986
 2nd : Thomas Adcock, "Thrown-Away Child", Oct 1986
 3rd : Nell Lamburn, "Tom's Thatch", Jul 1986

1985
 1st : Clark Howard, "Animals", Jun 1985
 2nd : Lawrence Block, "Like a Bug on a Windshield", Oct 1985
 3rd : Clark Howard, "McCulla's Kid", Sep 1985

Records

Edward D. Hoch, who contributed a story each month, had so many stories nominated, they kept him from taking first place until 2007. He received notification shortly before his death.

Clark Howard often won first place and placed second or third in the same year.

Doug Allyn has won more often than any other author.

Leigh Lundin (under the pseudonym L. Leigh) in 2006 became the first first-time writer to take first place in a major Ellery Queen award.

Dale Andrews, a student of the Ellery Queen canon, became the first to place with an Ellery Queen story.

References

External links 
 Ellery Queen Mystery Magazine awards page

American literary awards